Robert Martin (March 31, 1916 – January 16, 1992) was an American audio engineer. He was nominated for an Academy Award in the category Sound Recording for the film Gaily, Gaily.

Selected filmography
 Gaily, Gaily (1969)

References

External links

1916 births
1992 deaths
American audio engineers
People from Pennsylvania
20th-century American engineers